Neumeister is a surname. Notable people with the surname include:

Alexander Neumeister (born 1941), German industrial designer
Ed Neumeister (born 1952), American jazz composer and trombonist
Erdmann Neumeister (1671–1756), German Lutheran pastor and hymnologist
Frank Neumeister, German coxswain
Otto C. Neumeister (1866–1938), American businessman, pharmacist and politician
Johann Gottfried Neumeister (1757–1840), author of the so-called Neumeister Collection, a compilation of chorale preludes  composed, among others, by Johann Sebastian Bach.